Barbershop is an American comedy media franchise that started in 2002 with Barbershop, directed by Tim Story. Barbershop 2: Back in Business was directed by Kevin Rodney Sullivan and released in 2004, while the third film, Barbershop: The Next Cut directed by Malcolm D. Lee, was released in April 2016. A spin-off starring Queen Latifah, Beauty Shop, was released in 2005, along with a television series of the same name debuting in the same year.

The series received generally positive reviews and grossed over $235 million worldwide.

Films

Barbershop (2002)

A smart comedy about a day in a barbershop on the south side of Chicago. Calvin (Ice Cube), who inherited the struggling business from his deceased father, views the shop as nothing but a burden and a waste of his time. After selling the shop to a local loan shark, Calvin slowly begins to see his father's vision and legacy and struggles with the notion that he just sold it out.

Barbershop 2: Back in Business (2004)

This sequel to the 2002 film returns to the Chicago barbershop owned by Calvin Palmer Jr. (Ice Cube). His employees—Isaac (Troy Garity), Terri (Eve), Ricky (Michael Ealy), Dinka (Leonard Earl Howze) and Kenard (Kenan Thompson)—have their own personal and workplace problems, and a new barbershop called Nappy Cutz has moved in across the street. As Calvin tries to change the character of his business, Nappy Cutz and gentrification become a threat to the surrounding community.

Barbershop: The Next Cut (2016)

Malcolm D. Lee directs, while Ice Cube and Cedric the Entertainer are among the cast of the film. The film was released on April 15, 2016.

Spin-off

Beauty Shop (2005)

A spin-off from the first two Barbershop films, Gina Norris (Queen Latifah) is a widowed hairstylist who has moved from Chicago to Atlanta so her daughter, Vanessa (Paige Hurd), can attend a private music school. She has made a name for herself as a stylist, but after her self-centered boss, Jorge (Kevin Bacon), criticizes her decisions, she leaves and sets up her own shop, purchasing a run-down salon by the skin of her teeth by helping out a loan officer.

Television series

Barbershop (2005)

Cast and crew

Note: A light grey cell indicates the character who did not appear in that film.

Crew

Reception

Critical reception

Box office performance

References 

Barbershop (franchise)
Comedy franchises
Film franchises
Film series introduced in 2002
Films adapted into television shows
Metro-Goldwyn-Mayer franchises
New Line Cinema franchises

Notes